Rectory, Catholic Church of the Assumption is a historic rectory at 563 Ocean Avenue in Ferndale, California which was added to the National Register of Historic Places in 1982.

History
The first Catholic church in Ferndale was completed on 9 May 1879 and served until 1895 when it was moved from the corner of Washington and Berding streets to another lot on Washington.  The new church was built at Washington and Berding by J.W. Blackmore, at a cost of $4,062.50 and dedicated on 16 August 1896.

In 1883 the first rectory was replaced with a second one on the site of the old one to the north of the church, facing Berding Street.  In 1964, the congregation decided to tear down the second rectory building to build a third one, at a cost of $64,763.91.  A descendant of one of Ferndale's pioneer families, Mrs. Viola Russ McBride, purchased the second rectory for $1.00 from Church authorities and had it moved to its present location at 563 Ocean.

References

External links
 
 

Houses on the National Register of Historic Places in California
Queen Anne architecture in California
Buildings and structures in Ferndale, California
Houses in Humboldt County, California
National Register of Historic Places in Humboldt County, California
1879 establishments in California